Kalvari-class submarine may refer to:

 , the variant of Foxtrot-class submarines built for the Indian Navy in 1960s
 , the variant of Scorpène-class submarines built for the Indian Navy since 2010s